Maranchon Wind Farm is located in Maranchón, Guadalajara, Spain. The "Maranchon Complex", as it is called, actually consists of seven smaller wind parks with a total capacity of 208 MW, and it was the largest in Europe for some time. It is owned by Iberdrola and was dedicated in May 2006.

See also

 Wind power in Spain

Wind farms in Spain
Energy in Castilla–La Mancha